Telecommunications in the Bahamas is accomplished through the transmission of information by various types of technologies within The Bahamas, mainly telephones, radio, television, and the Internet.

Status

Internet censorship and surveillance

Access to the Internet is unrestricted. There were no government restrictions on access to the Internet or credible reports that the government monitors e-mail or Internet chat rooms without judicial oversight.

The constitution provides for freedom of speech and press, and the government generally respects these rights in practice. An independent press combined with a relatively effective—albeit extremely backlogged—judiciary, and a functioning democratic political system ensures freedom of speech and press. The constitution prohibits arbitrary interference with privacy, family, home, or correspondence, and the government generally respects these prohibitions in practice. Strict and antiquated libel laws dating to British legal codes are seldom invoked.

In April 2013, the Bahamas Commissioner of Police Ellison Greenslade warned that the police would press charges against people who post “lewd” or “obscene” pictures on social media websites and Attorney General Allyson Maynard-Gibson announced that the government was working on legislation that will police information posted on the Internet. "We have to balance freedom of the press with protecting the public,” she added. Also in April Rodney Moncur was charged with "committing a grossly indecent act" by posting autopsy photographs of a man who died in police custody on his Facebook page.

Phone calls to the Bahamas are monitored by the U.S. National Security Agency's MYSTIC program.

See also
 Bahamas
 BTC (Bahamas), Bahamas Telecommunications Company, primary telecommunications provider for the Bahamas, partly government owned.
 List of television stations in the Caribbean
 Television in the Bahamas
 ZNS-1, Radio Bahamas, state-owned
 ZNS-TV 13, state-owned

References

External links
 BSNIC, Bahamas Network Information Center.
 Bahamas Telecommunications Company, website.
 ZNS Bahamas, website.
 Bahamas, SubmarineCableMap.com

 
Bahamas
Bahamas
Bahamas